Eha or EHA may refer to:

Education 
 East Haven Academy, in Connecticut
 East Holmes Academy, a closed segregation academy in West, Mississippi
 Economic History Association, an American academic research society
 Education for All Handicapped Children Act, of the United States Congress
 Epstein Hebrew Academy, in Olivette, Missouri

People 
 Eha (given name), an Estonian feminine given name
 Edward Hamilton Aitken (1851–1909), British naturalist and humorist
 Franz Eha (1907–1974), Swiss long distance runner

Health  
 European Hematology Association, a professional organisation
 EcoHealth Alliance A NGO for protecting health from infectious diseases

Other uses 
 East Hampton Aire, a defunct US airline
 Egg hatch assay
 Eha Railway, in China
 Electro-hydraulic actuator
 Elkhart–Morton County Airport, in Kansas, United States
 Engineering Heritage Awards
 England Handball Association
 English Hockey Association, now England Hockey
 Environmental Health Australia, a professional organisation
 Estonian Handball Association
 Ethernet Hardware Address